White Nights is a 1959 Soviet drama film directed by Ivan Pyryev.

Plot 
The film takes place in St. Petersburg in the middle of the 19th century in the summer. The film tells about a lonely dreamer, who meets a girl named Nastya, whom she immediately falls in love with. Every night they walk around the city together. It seems to the dreamer that he has found his soul mate, but another man appears in Nastya's life...

Cast 
 Lyudmila Marchenko as Nastya
 Oleg Strizhenov as the dreamer
 Anatoli Fedorinov as  Nastya's fiance
 Svetlana Kharitonova as Fyokla
 Yakov Belenkiy as duke
 Yevgeny Morgunov as guard
 Vera Popova as Praskovya Ivanovna
 Ariadna Shengelaya as slave in dance dreams
 Irina Skobtseva as duchess
 Iozas Udras as episode
 Sergei Troitsky as drunken merchant
 Galina Polskikh as episode at the ball (uncredited)

References

External links 
 

1959 films
1950s Russian-language films
Soviet drama films
1959 drama films
Films based on White Nights
Films based on short fiction

Films set in Saint Petersburg
Mosfilm films
Soviet romantic drama films
Films directed by Ivan Pyryev